The 2007–08 Israel State Cup (Gvia HaMedina) was the 69th season of Israel's nationwide football cup competition and the 54th after the Israeli Declaration of Independence. 

The competition was won by Beitar Jerusalem who had beaten Hapoel Tel Aviv on penalties after 0–0 in the final.

As Beitar Jerusalem won the double, Hapoel Tel Aviv qualified to the 2008–09 UEFA Cup, entering in the first qualifying round.

Calendar

Results

Seventh Round

Byes: Beitar Shimshon Tel Aviv, Hapoel Bnei Jisr az-Zarqa, Hapoel Iksal, Hapoel Jerusalem.

Eighth Round

Ninth Round

Round of 16 to the Final
Games were played from March 11, 2008 to May 13, 2008.

External links
 Israel Football Association website

Israel State Cup
State Cup
Israel State Cup seasons